Agung Prasetyo may refer to:

 Agung Prasetyo (footballer, born 1978)
 Agung Prasetyo (footballer, born 1992)